DNA and Cell Biology is a scientific journal published by Mary Ann Liebert, Inc., and covers topics related to DNA and cell biology, such as:

Gene structure, function and regulation
Molecular medicine
Cellular organelles
Protein biosynthesis and degradation
Cell-autonomous inflammation and host cell response to infection
Articles produced with NIH funding appear in PubMed Central a year after publication, starting with volume 27 (2008).

Indexing
DNA and Cell Biology is indexed in:

References

Biology journals
Publications established in 1981
Mary Ann Liebert academic journals
Monthly journals